Tufanganj is a town and a municipality of Cooch Behar district in the Indian state of West Bengal. It is the headquarters of the Tufanganj subdivision.

Geography

The river Raidak flows beside the town to the east.

According to the District Census Handbook 2011, Koch Bihar, Tufanganj covered an area of 2.49 km2.

Area overview
The map alongside shows the eastern part of the district. In Tufanganj subdivision 6.97% of the population lives in the urban areas and 93.02% lives in the rural areas. In Dinhata subdivision 5.98% of the population lives in the urban areas and 94.02% lives in the urban areas. The entire district forms the flat alluvial flood plains of mighty rivers.

Note: The map alongside presents some of the notable locations in the subdivisions. All places marked in the map are linked in the larger full screen map.

Demographics
As per 2011 Census of India Tufanganj had a total population of 20,998 of which 10,684 (51%) were males and 10,314 (49%) were females. Population in the age range 0–6 years was 1,619. The total number of literate persons in Tufanganj was 17,727 (91.48% of the population over 6 years).

 India census, Tufanganj had a population of 19,293. Males constitute 51% of the population and females 49%. Tufanganj has an average literacy rate of 82%, higher than the national average of 59.5%: male literacy is 86%, and female literacy is 77%. In Tufanganj, 9% of the population is under 6 years of age.

Municipal Area
Tufanganj is one of the 6 municipal town (Cooch Behar, Dinhata,Mathabhanga, Tufanganj,  Mekhliganj, Haldibari) of Cooch Behar District. Tufanganj Municipality was established in 1983.The Municipality consists of 12 wards.It is the last municipal town of West Bengal near Assam Border. Municipality has a great reputation in all over the Cooch Behar District.

Civic administration

Police station
Tufanganj police station has jurisdiction over Tufanganj municipal area and Tufanganj I CD block.

CD block HQ
The headquarters of the Tufanganj I CD block are located at Tufanganj town.

Transport
There is a station Tufanganj Railway Station on the New Cooch Behar-Golokganj branch line. Apart from local connections, there are trains such as Siliguri-Dhubri DEMU which passes through the Dooars.

Education

Colleges
Tufanganj Mahavidyalaya was established in 1971. Affiliated with the Cooch Behar Panchanan Barma University, it offers honours courses in Bengali, English, Sanskrit, philosophy, History, geography, Political science, Sociology, Economics, Botany, Zoology, Chemistry and general courses in arts, science and commerce. Many Students came here to pursue their higher education from this prestigious college.

 Tufanganj Government Polytechnic  is a  Diploma Engineering  Institute, which was established in 2014. Affiliated to WBSCTE. Here, 3 Departments are available now :  Civil , Mechanical , Survey . It is located in Chamta, outside 2 KMs. from  Tufanganj  Main Town. The faculties and facilities are well in the institution.

Schools
 Nripendra Narayan Memorial High School / Tufanganj NNM High School
 Tufanganj Andaranfulbari Harirdham High School
 Tufanganj Iladevi Girls' High School
 Tufanganj Vivekananda Vidyalaya
 Tufanganj Angadevi Girls' High School

Sports
Outdoor competitions are organized by the Tufanganj Municipality.  The town has one outdoor stadium that is maintained by Sub-divisional Sports Association and one national level swimming pool.

The youth, Krishnakata Sarkar from Harirhat in Tufanganj has represented India in the World Amateur Bodybuilding Championships (65 kg and below) organised by the International Federation of Bodybuilders (IFBB).Krishna Kanta, whose father Dharani was a day labourer, became Mr India in 2007. Now, he is after the biggest crown in the world as part of a 17-member team from India.

A member of the Bengal cricket team, Shib Sankar Paul, a right arm medium bowler of a tall and bulky frame and debuted in the 2000/01 season. A regular in the Indian A side, he was part of India's Test squad for the 4th Test against Australia in 2004/05. Shib Sankar Paul Paul was an integral part of the Bengal line up during his long and illustrious career. Paul now has his own cricket academy and is also the coach of Barisha Sporting Club in the bengal club circle...

Culture
Tufanganj is rich in Bengali culture. There is an old Community Hall where various cultural programs happens throughout the year. It is one of the centers for Bhawaiya song and dance. Durga Puja is celebrated in a grand way here. Tufanganj Devibari Durga Puja is the oldest Durga Puja in Tufanganj. Tufanganj Madan Mohan Bari Temple is famous for devotees.

Dol Mela
Dol Mela is an annual cultural fair, held in every March-April seasons. It starts on the auspicious Dol Purnima/Holi. Every year, many people attend the fair and it becomes a grand fest of Tufanganj Town. It creates a ambience of joy over the town for around 14-15 days. From the various part of India, many shopkeeper and business persons sell a lot of things. The Idol of Lord Krishna is placed in "Choto Madan Mohan Bari" in Melabari Ground.

Healthcare
Tufanganj Subdivisional Hospital functions with 100 beds and Tufanganj Mental Hospital has 30 beds. Tufanganj Mental Hospital is one of the biggest and finest mental hospital in North Bengal. Tufanganj has also a veterinary hospital.

Notable people 

 Abbasuddin Ahmed (Bhawaiya Singer)
 Shib Paul (Cricketer)
 Ananta Saha (Cricketer)

References

External links
 Tufanganj Mahavidyalaya

Cities and towns in Cooch Behar district